Egg in the basket—also known by many other names—is an egg fried in a hole in a slice of bread.

Description 

The dish consists of a slice of bread with an egg in the middle, fried with butter or oil.  It is commonly prepared by cutting a circular or square hole in the center of a piece of bread, which may be buttered.  The bread is fried in a pan with butter, margarine, cooking oil, or other fat.  At some point, an egg is cracked into the hole in the bread. When the egg is added to the bread determines how well-done the egg and bread will be relative to each other in the final product. The pan may be covered and the bread flipped while on the heat to obtain even cooking. A waffle or bagel (with a large enough hole) can also be substituted for the slice of bread.

Names and appearances in pop culture 
There are many names for the dish, including "bullseye eggs", "eggs in a frame", "egg in a hole", "eggs in a nest", "gashouse eggs", "gashouse special", "gasthaus eggs", "hole in one", "one-eyed Jack", "one-eyed Pete", "pirate's eye", and "popeye". The name "toad in the hole" is sometimes used for this dish, though that name more commonly refers to sausages cooked in Yorkshire pudding batter.

The dish is also known as "Guy Kibbee eggs", due to its preparation by actor Guy Kibbee in the 1935 Warner Bros film Mary Jane's Pa. In the film, Kibbee's character refers to the dish as a “one-eyed Egyptian sandwich”. It is also called "Betty Grable eggs", from the actress’ preparation of "gashouse eggs" in the 1941 film Moon Over Miami. It is prepared by both Hugo Weaving and Stephen Fry's characters in the 2005 film V for Vendetta, the latter referring to it as "eggy in the basket". Other film appearances include Moonstruck (1987) and The Meddler (2016). 

On television, the dish is prepared in a 1987 episode of Sledge Hammer!, with the title character using his revolver to shoot the hole in the bread. In a 1996 episode of Friends, character Joey Tribbiani refers to it as "eggs with the bread with the hole in the middle, à la me!" In a 2016 episode of Lucifer, it is prepared with Hawaiian bread. Other television appearances include Frasier (1993), Once Upon A Time (2013),The Marvelous Mrs. Maisel (2019), Atypical (2019), Search Party (2022). and Resident Alien (2022),

Author Roald Dahl wrote numerous times of his fondness for the dish, which he referred to as "hot-house eggs".

See also 

 French toast
 Fried egg
 Khachapuri
 List of bread dishes
 List of egg dishes
 List of toast dishes

References 

Egg dishes
Bread dishes